The Walnut Creek mainstem is a  northward-flowing stream in northern California. The Walnut Creek watershed lies in central Contra Costa County, California and drains the west side of Mount Diablo and the east side of the East Bay Hills. The Walnut Creek mainstem is now mostly a concrete or earthen flood control channel until it reaches Pacheco Creek on its way to Suisun Bay. Walnut Creek was named for the abundant native Northern California walnut trees (Juglans hindsii) which lined its banks historically. The city of Walnut Creek, California was named for the creek when its post office was established in the 1860s.

History 

There are three bands of Bay Miwok Native Americans associated with early Walnut Creek, the stream for which the city of Walnut Creek is named: the Saclan, whose territory extended through the hills east of present-day Oakland, Rossmoor, Lafayette, Moraga and Walnut Creek; the Volvon (also spelled Bolbon, Wolwon and Zuicun) near Mt. Diablo; and the Tactan located on the San Ramon Creek in Danville and Walnut Creek.

Today's Walnut Creek is located within the earlier site of four Mexican land grants. One of these land grantsmeasuring belonged to Juana Sanchez de Pacheco, who eventually passed the land down to her two grandsons. Ygnacio Sibrian, one of the grandsons, created the first roofed home in the valley in about 1850. The grant was called Rancho Arroyo de Las Nueces y Bolbones, named after the principal waterway, Arroyo de Las Nueces (Walnut Creek), as well as for the local group of indigenous Americans (Bolbones). The Arroyo de Las Nueces or Arroyo de Los Nogales referred to the plentiful Northern California walnut trees on its banks.

The first town settler was William Slusher, who built a dwelling on the bank of Walnut Creek, which was called "Nuts Creek" by the Americans in 1849.

Watershed and course 

While the mainstem Walnut Creek flows through densely urbanized areas, the upper watersheds of its tributaries generally remain undeveloped open space. Las Trampas Creek drains  of Lafayette, Orinda, Moraga, and unincorporated lands in the western Walnut Creek watershed. Lafayette Creek emerges from Lafayette Reservoir to join Las Trampas Creek in Lafayette. Tice Creek joins Las Trampas Creek from the right (heading downstream) to form the Walnut Creek mainstem. Next, San Ramon Creek joins the mainstem Walnut Creek underground near the intersection of Mount Diablo Boulevard and Broadway. The San Ramon Creek subwatershed begins at the northern border of the city of San Ramon's border with Danville and flows northwards through the San Ramon Valley. San Ramon Creek begins as Bollinger Creek, which drains the Las Trampas Regional Wilderness. After becoming San Ramon Creek, the two main tributaries of the  San Ramon watershed are Green Valley Creek and Sycamore Creek, which drain the western slopes of Mount Diablo. Pine Creek drains the west slopes of flows through Mount Diablo State Park, Diablo Foothills Regional Park, and Castle Rock Regional Recreational Area. It is joined by Galindo Creek downstream of Monument Boulevard in Concord, before it joins Walnut Creek. The  Clayton Drain drains urbanized Concord through the Clayton Valley. It used to receive flows from Mount Diablo Creek before the latter was diverted into Seal Creek along the east side of the valley The drain enters the Walnut Creek channel just upstream of Highway 4. Lastly, Grayson Creek drains the eastern flank of the Briones Hills and its  subwatershed includes Murderer’s Creek and Hidden Valley Creek. It joins Walnut Creek from the left just downstream of Highway 4. Shortly thereafter, Walnut Creek ends as it joins Pacheco Creek from the right (heading downstream). From that confluence, Pacheco Creek flows north  through the Concord Marsh into Suisun Bay.

Ecology 

Walnut Creek is one of the few San Francisco Bay Area coastal watersheds that has extant Chinook salmon (Oncorhynchus tshawytscha) spawning and rearing, in its lower watershed.

See also
 List of rivers in California
 List of watercourses in the San Francisco Bay Area

References

See also
 Walnut Creek Watershed page, by the Contra Costa County Resource Conservation District
 Walnut Creek Watershed Council
 Contra Costa County Watershed Forum main page

Rivers of the San Francisco Bay Area
Rivers of Contra Costa County, California